Vibha Batra (born 28 November) is a Chennai-based Indian author, advertising consultant, poet, lyricist, translator, travel writer, playwright, and columnist. Punjabi by descent, Vibha was born and raised in Kolkata and later moved to Chennai many years ago. She has published 17 books including The Secret Life of Debbie G (a graphic novel) Merry the Elephant's Rainy Day, Bathinda to Bangkok, The Reluctant Debutante, The Dream Merchants, Keeping it Real, Euro Trip, Ludhiana to London, Glitter and Gloss, The Activist and The Capitalist, Sweet Sixteen (Yeah, Right!), Seventeen and Done (you Done!), Eighteen and Wiser (Not Quite!), Family Crossword, A Twist of Lime, Tongue in Cheek, and Ishaavaasya Upanishad: Knowledge and Action.  

Her travelogues have appeared in The Hindu, Conde Nast Traveller, Deccan Chronicle, and The Week. Her plays have been staged during the Short and Sweet Theatre Festival South India and her play 'Cold Feet' won the Best Script – Week 2 in 2017. She wrote the Hindi lyrics for Thuppaki and has written the anthems for leading corporate houses like The Chola Group, Murugappa, Brakes India, and Cavin Kare. She has contributed short stories and poems to international anthologies, print magazines and ezines. Her Sweet Sixteen trilogy published by Penguin has been optioned for the screen.  

Batra has been invited as a speaker to the following events:
 As a Book at the Human Library Chennai
 As a Guest Storyteller at The Narrative
 As a Bliss Catcher
 At SIET College, Bhavans school (as a judge), KC High (workshop)
 International Conference of Children's Literature Thrissur
 At Bengal Association Chennai (felicitated for contribution to literature)
 The Spoken Word Festival Chennai (panellist)
 Bookaroo Festival (workshop)
 Miramed Ajuba (as Chief Guest)
 Writing Facilitator at The British Council Chennai (workshops)
 Guest of Honour at Hi Life Exhibition (inaugurated it)
 Guest of Honour at Voylla Store, Phoenix Mall (inaugurated it)
 Judge at Scholastic Writing Awards 2019
 Speaker at Kalinga Literary Festival Bhava Samvad
 Hosted the Silent Book Club at Juggernaut Books
 Judge at OPUS 2020, online inter-school festival
 Judge at Inferno 2020, Asia’s first online inter-college festival ISDI School of Design and Innovation
 Creative Writing Workshop at BIC – Bangalore International Centre
 Webinar on Body Positivity conducted by Collins Learning India
 Speaker at Chandigarh International Literary Festival – Literati 2020

References 

Year of birth missing (living people)
Living people